Simplicity is an album by jazz guitarist Joe Pass that was released in 1967. Simplicity was reissued with A Sign of the Times on CD by Euphoria Records in 2002.

Reception

Writing for AllMusic, music critic Ron Wynn wrote of the album: "smooth, fluent songs, crisp, polished solos, and sentimental material, and does everything with a modicum of effort and intensity".

Track listing
 "You and Me" (Vinicius de Moraes, Carlos Lyra)
 "Tis Autumn" (Henry Nemo)
 "Luciana" (Antônio Carlos Jobim, de Moraes, Gene Lees)
 "I Had the Craziest Dream" (Mack Gordon, Harry Warren)
 "Nobody Else but Me" (Oscar Hammerstein II, Jerome Kern)
 "Simplicity" (Joe Pass)
 "The Sands of Time" (Timothy Barr, Jerry Leshay)
 "Sometime Ago" (Sergio Mihanovich)
 "The Gentle Rain" (Luiz Bonfá, Matt Dubey)
 "Who Can I Turn To?" (Leslie Bricusse, Anthony Newley)
 "Where Was I (Donde Estuve Yo)" (Tommye Karen, Allan Reuss, Rainey Robinson)

Personnel
 Joe Pass – guitar
 Hagood Hardy – vibes
 Julian Lee – piano, organ
 Bob Whitlock – double bass
 Colin Bailey – drums

References

1967 albums
Bebop albums
Joe Pass albums
Pacific Jazz Records albums